The Salt Lake Sting was a professional soccer team based in Salt Lake City, Utah. They played in the American Professional Soccer League. The club was originally owned by Jack Donovan, who was also the head of the ownership group for Salt Lake City's minor league baseball team of the era, the Salt Lake Trappers. The Sting lasted parts of two seasons, but financial concerns caused league officials to shut the franchise down in midseason on July 5, 1991.

Stadium
The Sting played their short career at Derks Field, a minor-league baseball stadium. The field was laid out in the outfield, and a portion of the field was dirt because it was the infield portion of the baseball diamond.

Initial season
Nearly 10,000 fans attended the first game in April, 1990.  The club averaged 5,400 attendees over the 13 games of the first season.  This thrilled the ownership as they were hoping to average 2,500.  A crowd of 9,439 watched the final game against the San Diego Nomads.  The Sting ended the season with a 12-8 record and second place in the Western Soccer League conference.  They were knocked out of the playoffs by the Colorado Foxes 2-1 and 4-1. George Pastor was the second leading scorer and Derek Sanderson was the fifth leading scorer in the APSL.

Second season
Director Fred Gray had high hopes for the 1991 season with new coach Valery Volostnykn. The new squad returned leading scored George Pastor and added local talent Steve Sengelmann of Provo and goalkeeper Pat Vietti of Salt Lake.  The club ended the season with a 3-17 record and folded before the final game could be played.

Ownership
 Jack Donovan

Staff
 Mark Hugo - General Manager
 Dave Baggott - Assistant General Manager
 Fred Gray - Public Relations Director/Director of Soccer Operations

Coaching
The team was coached by Laurie Calloway from England during their rookie season in 1990.  The coach for the Salt Lake Sting in 1991 was Valery Volostnykh from Russia who previously coached at Real Santa Barbara.

 Laurie Calloway (1990)
 Valery Volostnykh (1991)

Players
 :Category:Salt Lake Sting players

Year-by-year

References 

Soccer clubs in Salt Lake City
Defunct soccer clubs in Utah
American Professional Soccer League teams
1990 establishments in Utah
1991 disestablishments in Utah
Association football clubs established in 1990
Association football clubs disestablished in 1991